Nothing in Return is a 2015 Spanish drama film directed by Daniel Guzmán.

Cast 
 Miguel Herrán - Darío
 Antonio Bachiller - Luismi
 Antonia Guzmán - Antonia
 Felipe García Vélez - Justo Caralimpia
 Luis Tosar - Padre Darío
 María Miguel - Madre Darío
 Miguel Rellán - Profesor

See also 
 List of Spanish films of 2015

References

External links 

2015 drama films
2015 films
Spanish drama films
2010s Spanish films
2010s Spanish-language films